In the mathematical area of knot theory, the unknotting number of a knot is the minimum number of times the knot must be passed through itself (crossing switch) to untie it. If a knot has unknotting number , then there exists a diagram of the knot which can be changed to unknot by switching  crossings. The unknotting number of a knot is always less than half of its crossing number.

Any composite knot has unknotting number at least two, and therefore every knot with unknotting number one is a prime knot. The following table show the unknotting numbers for the first few knots:

In general, it is relatively difficult to determine the unknotting number of a given knot. Known cases include:
 The unknotting number of a nontrivial twist knot is always equal to one.
 The unknotting numbers of prime knots with nine or fewer crossings have all been determined. (The unknotting number of the 1011 prime knot is unknown.)

Other numerical knot invariants
 Crossing number
 Bridge number
 Linking number
 Stick number

See also
Unknotting problem

References

External links

Knot invariants